Abouna (English: "Our Father") is a 2002 film by Chadian director Mahamat Saleh Haroun and is the story of two young brothers' search for their father. It was filmed on location in Gaoui and N'Djamena, Chad. It was the Chadian submission for the Academy Award for Best Foreign Language Film at the 75th Academy Awards but was not nominated.

Plot 
Two boys (Tahir and Amine) awake one morning to find that their father has abandoned their family.  Shocked, they begin to misbehave.  While surreptitiously watching a movie, they think they see their father speaking to them and steal the film to examine the frames.  Their mother (Achta) eventually despairs and sends them to Koranic school.  Unhappy, they plan their escape until the eldest boy falls in love with a deaf girl (Khalil)

Casting and production 
Ahidjo Mahamat Moussa, who played the 15-year-old Tahir, was offered a choice of boys to play his younger brother Amine.  He eventually chose eight-year-old Hamza Moctar Aguid because he felt that Aguid could really be his brother.

After each day for shooting, film was sent 2600 miles to Paris for processing. Only after waiting several days, when word came back that there were no problems, would shooting resume.

Cast 
 Ahidjo Mahamat Moussa as Tahir  
 Hamza Moctar Aguid as Amine
 Zara Haroun as Achta (the mother)   
 Mounira Khalil as Mute girl
 Diego Moustapha Ngarade as Uncle Adoum

Awards 
The film won the following awards:
 2002 Hong Kong International Film Festival: Firebird Award – Special Mention
 2002 Kerala International Film Festival: FIPRESCI Prize and Golden Crow Pheasant
 2003 Ouagadougou Panafrican Film and Television Festival: Baobab Seed Award, Best Cinematography, INALCO Award and UNICEF Award for Childhood

See also 
 List of Chadian submissions for the Academy Award for Best Foreign Language Film

References

External links 
 

2002 films
Chadian drama films
2002 drama films
2000s Arabic-language films
2000s French-language films
Films directed by Mahamat-Saleh Haroun
Films set in Chad
2002 multilingual films